The 72nd Infantry Division (72-ya Pekhotnaya Diviziya) was an infantry formation of the Russian Imperial Army. It was mobilized twice, in 1904–1905 for the Russo-Japanese War and in 1914–1918 for World War I.

Organization
1st Brigade
285th Infantry Regiment
286th Infantry Regiment
2nd Brigade
287th Infantry Regiment
288th Infantry Regiment

References

Infantry divisions of the Russian Empire